Andy Duncan (born 21 September 1964) is an   American science fiction and fantasy writer whose work frequently deals with Southern U.S. themes.

Biography
Duncan was born in Batesburg, South Carolina and graduated from high school from W.W. Wyman King Academy. He earned a degree in journalism from the University of South Carolina and worked for seven years at the Greensboro News & Record. His novelette "Close Encounters" won the 2012 Nebula Award for Best Novelette. His novelette "An Agent of Utopia" was a finalist for the 2018 Nebula Award. 

Duncan earned an M.A. in creative writing (fiction) from North Carolina State University and an M.F.A. in fiction writing from the University of Alabama. He also attended Clarion West Writers Workshop in 1994.

In Fall 2008, he was hired as an Assistant Professor of English at Frostburg State University in Frostburg, MD.

His fiction has appeared in a number of venues, including Asimov's Science Fiction, Realms of Fantasy, Weird Tales, SciFiction, and Escape Pod. He has also published poetry, essays, and reviews.

Personal life
Duncan currently lives with his wife Sydney in Frostburg, Maryland along with a 17 year old dog Lily, and cats Bella and Hilary.

Bibliography

Novels
 The Night Cache (stand-alone novella), 2009, PS Publishing,

Collections
 The Pottawatomie Giant and Other Stories, PS Publishing, 2011
 Beluthahatchie and Other Stories, Golden Gryphon Press, 2000

Edited works
 Crossroads: Tales of the Southern Literary Fantastic (with F. Brett Cox), Tor Books, 2004

Nonfiction
 Alabama Curiosities: Quirky Characters, Roadside Oddities & Other Offbeat Stuff, Globe Pequot, 2005

Professional activities 
In October 2022, Andy Duncan was a guest on the Maryland State Library Agency Podcast in the Episode titled 'Spooky Maryland Stories with Andy Duncan.' 

He was a senior editor at Overdrive, a magazine for truck drivers, from 2003 to 2008.

Duncan was an instructor at Clarion Workshop in 2004 and at Clarion West in 2005.

He has frequently given readings and spoken on panels at such venues as the International Conference on the Fantastic in the Arts, held each spring in Florida.

Duncan starred as the main character, Counter, in a live dramatization of Jeanne Beckwith's one-act play The Back Room, performed with award-winning authors John Kessel and James Morrow, author and scholar Dr. F. Brett Cox, writer and critic Fiona Kelleghan, Sydney Sowers, and Buffy the Vampire Slayer expert Dr. Rhonda V. Wilcox. The play was presented at the 17th International Conference on the Fantastic in the Arts, held in Fort Lauderdale, Florida, March 19, 1999.

Awards 

He has won the Theodore Sturgeon Award. and three World Fantasy Awards, and has been nominated for Hugo, Nebula Award and Shirley Jackson Award. The Night Cache was nominated in the Best Novella category for a 2010 World Fantasy Award.

He won the 2012 Nebula Award for Best Novelette for "Close Encounters" featured in The Pottawatomie Giant and Other Stories. His novelette "An Agent of Utopia" was also a finalist for the 2018 Nebula Award.

References

External links
 Official blog
 Duncan's personal website
 2000 Interview at Infinity Plus
 2001 Interview excerpt at Locus Magazine
 Complete bibliography

1964 births
Living people
21st-century American short story writers
American fantasy writers
American male short story writers
American science fiction writers
People from Batesburg-Leesville, South Carolina
Nebula Award winners
World Fantasy Award-winning writers
People from Frostburg, Maryland
21st-century American male writers
20th-century American short story writers
20th-century American male writers
Writers from South Carolina
Writers from Maryland
North Carolina State University alumni
University of Alabama alumni
University of South Carolina alumni
Frostburg State University faculty